Duldul was a mule owned by the Islamic prophet Muhammad.

She is an Alid symbol in Shia Islam. The first Safavid Emperor, Ismail I, rose to power as the leader of Kizilbash, antinomian Sufi warriors who were fervently Alid. Ismail, a noted poet under the pen name Hatayi, justified his own divine role as leader by variously writing that he himself is Ali's offspring; he is Ali himself; he possesses Zulfiqar, Duldul and ‘Ali’s hat.

See also
 Buraq
 Ya`fūr
 al-Muqawqis
 Zuljanah

References

Individual mules
Possessions of Muhammad
Animals in the medieval Islamic world
Ali
Animals in Islam